The 2006 Major League Soccer All-Star Game was the 11th Major League Soccer All-Star Game, played on August 5, 2006, at Toyota Park in Bridgeview, Illinois between the MLS All-Stars and Chelsea. The MLS All-Stars won the match 1–0, with Dwayne De Rosario scoring the winning goal in the 70th minute. The Coach of MLS All-Stars have chosen to start the game with players mostly from his team D.C. United and left stars like Freddy Adu on bench even though he was expected to put them in starting 11. On the interview in Polish YouTube channel “Kanal Sportowy” Peter Nowak admitted that he said to his superiors if they want to win the game they have to allow him to use his own players from D.C. United, which they did and won.

Match details

|valign="top"|
|valign="top" width="50%"|

Several players originally named in the MLS All-Stars roster had to withdraw as they were due to play in the New England Revolution vs Chivas USA match on August 6; these included Ante Razov (Chivas), Shalrie Joseph and Clint Dempsey (both New England). Landon Donovan, Pablo Mastroeni and Eddie Pope also withdrew from the All-Star game through injury. Facundo Erpen, Ricardo Clark and Eddie Robinson were called up to replace them.

External links
2006 MLS All-Star Game Recap 

MLS All-Star Game
MLS All-Star 2006
Soccer in Illinois
All-Star Game
MLS All-Star Game
August 2006 sports events in the United States
Sports competitions in Illinois